Peter Francis Vassella (born 4 January 1941) is an Australian former sprinter who competed in the 1964 Summer Olympics.

References

1941 births
Living people
Australian male sprinters
Olympic athletes of Australia
Athletes (track and field) at the 1964 Summer Olympics